Azadegan-e Yek (also Romanized as Āzādegān-e Yek) is a village in Najafabad Rural District, in the Central District of Sirjan County, Kerman Province, Iran. At the 2006 census, its population was 34, in 11 families.

References 

Populated places in Sirjan County